Kim Kyong-Jin (also Kim Gyeong-Jin, ; born February 25, 1986) is a North Korean judoka, who played for the extra-lightweight category. He won two medals, silver and bronze, for the 60 kg division at the Asian Judo Championships (2008 in Jeju City, South Korea and 2009 in Taipei, Taiwan).

Kim represented North Korea at the 2008 Summer Olympics in Beijing, where he competed for the men's extra-lightweight class (60 kg). He defeated Madagascar's Elie Norbert and Armenia's Hovhannes Davtyan in the preliminary rounds, before losing out the quarterfinal match, by two yuko and a kata gatame (shoulder hold), to Austria's Ludwig Paischer. Because his opponent advanced further into the final match, Kim offered another shot for the bronze medal by entering the repechage rounds. Unfortunately, he finished only in ninth place, after losing out the second repechage bout to Great Britain's Craig Fallon, who successfully scored a waza-ari (half-point) and a kuchiki taoshi (single leg takedown), at the end of the five-minute period.

It is believed that Kim is an illegitimate son of North Korea’s founder, Kim Il-sung, and his then-mistress Kim Ok, who was a musician at the time of his birth. Kim Ok would later serve as secretary and mistress to Kim Il-sung’s son, Kim Jong-il.

References

External links

NBC Olympics Profile

North Korean male judoka
Living people
Olympic judoka of North Korea
Judoka at the 2008 Summer Olympics
1986 births
Judoka at the 2006 Asian Games
Judoka at the 2010 Asian Games
Asian Games competitors for North Korea